The American Music Award for Favorite Rock Artist has been awarded since 1995. Years reflect the year in which the awards were presented, for works released in the previous year (until 2003 onward when awards were handed out on November of the same year). The all-time winner in this category is Linkin Park with 6 wins, they are also the most nominated act with 8 nominations.

Winners and nominees

1990s

2000s

2010s

2020s

Category facts

Multiple wins

 6 wins
 Linkin Park

 2 wins
 Creed
 Green Day
 Imagine Dragons
 Pearl Jam
 Red Hot Chili Peppers
 Twenty One Pilots
 Machine Gun Kelly

Multiple nominations

 8 nominations
 Linkin Park

 5 nominations
 Green Day
 Imagine Dragons

 4 nominations
 Coldplay

 3 nominations
 Foo Fighters
 Limp Bizkit
 Pearl Jam
 Red Hot Chili Peppers
 Twenty One Pilots

 2 nominations
 Billie Eilish
 The Black Keys
 Bush
 Creed
 Mumford & Sons
 Nine Inch Nails
 Panic! at the Disco
 System of a Down

References

American Music Awards
Awards established in 1995